Nikos Gioutsos (born 16 April 1942) is a retired Greek football player who played as a striker.   From the special style of play and the passion together with the dynamism he brought to the matches, the fans shouted the slogan "Έμπαινε Γιούτσο" (Enter and destroy the opponents) which became a song and line in old Greek movies.

References

1942 births
Living people
Greek footballers
Super League Greece players
Csepel SC footballers
Olympiacos F.C. players
Ethnikos Piraeus F.C. players
Greece international footballers
Greek expatriate footballers
Expatriate footballers in Hungary
Greek expatriate sportspeople in Hungary
Association football forwards
Olympiacos F.C. managers
Greek football managers
People from Korestia
Footballers from Western Macedonia